Nawasch Phupantachsee   (born January 15, 1996) also known as Pon Nawasch, is a Thai actor and model. He debuted in 2015. In 2019, Thailand Headlines selected him as 2019 Culture and Entertainment Person of the Year.

Nawasch is known for his role in the television series Tra Barb See Chompoo (2018) and Praomook (2021).

Early life and education
Nawasch was born on January 15, 1996, in Bangkok, Thailand. His immediate family includes his mother, father, a brother and a sister. His father Lieutenant General Tattthongak  Phupantachsee is the Provincial Police Chief of Satun province and his mother Chanutaporn Wisitsophon is a former actress who has acted in the famous film Phuean Phaeng (1983) and Ploy Talay.

When Nawasch was a child, he attended Ramkhamhaeng University Demonstration School. He received secondary education from Bodindecha (Sing Singhaseni) School. He graduated from the Faculty of Engineering, King Mongkut's Institute of Technology Ladkrabang with a Bachelor's degree (2nd class honors) in Music and Multimedia Engineering.

Career

2015–2017: Beginnings
In 2015, Nawasch entered the entertainment industry when he was still studying in the university. He was invited to the Phra Maha Phichai Crown ceremony to receive the adornment of the Buddha statue situated in Lat Krabang district. He participated in the "Young star Mekhala, Year 2013" contest and won the Photographer's Favorite award. He was also the winner of the WoW Young Man award from the Miner Young Wink Contest.

In 2017, Nawasch made his acting debut by playing Panthit, a new film director in the drama Sai Lub Jub Abb. Later, he received an opportunity to feature in Sanae Rak Nang Cin, playing Touch, owner of a textile company.

2018–present: Rising popularity
In 2018, Nawasch played his first leading role in the drama Tra Barb See Chompoo, alongside Nalinthip Sakulongumpai. The series was a success both domestically and internationally. Nawasch gained widespread recognition and popularity for his portrayal of Pete, who struggles to deal with emotion and wants revenge. He won the Best Actor award at the 2019 Kazz Awards for his performance.

In 2019, he starred in the lakorn Plerng Prang Tian. Then he played supporting roles in several drama.

In 2021, Nawasch starred in the drama "Praomook". He played the role of Chalunthorn or Lan opposite actress Nalinthip Sakulongumpai, who played the role of Praomook, creating a very peculiar story in which it starts with a love-hate relationship. But eventually they will begin to fall in love with each other and will face many obstacles on their way.

Filmography

Television series

Music video

Concert
 Channel 3 Super Fan Live!: SUPERNOVA Universe Explosion Concert

MC
 20 ยังไม่มี On Air YouTube:PonNawasch Official

Awards

References

External links

 
 

1996 births
Living people
Nawasch Phupantachsee
Nawasch Phupantachsee
Nawasch Phupantachsee
Nawasch Phupantachsee
Nawasch Phupantachsee
Nawasch Phupantachsee
Nawasch Phupantachsee